Agência Brasil (ABr.) is the national public news agency, run by the Brazilian government. The agency was founded in 1990 and it's part of the public media corporation Empresa Brasil de Comunicação (EBC), created in 2007 to unite two government media enterprises Radiobrás and TVE (Televisão Educativa). It is publishing contents under CC-BY.

ABr is one of the most important Brazilian news agencies, that feeds thousands of regional newspapers and websites throughout Brazil but also national media outlets like Estadão, O Globo, Folha de S.Paulo, UOL and Terra and according to its CEO, reaches more than 9 million people each month. Agência Brasil has a team dedicated in translating journalistic content to English and Spanish. The Agency also works with public news entities, such as Lusa, Xinhua and Telam to produce and carry out international information. In 2020, the agency became Reuters partner, which made the flow of international news common in the content produced by the vehicle.

Its headquarters are located in Brazilian capital, Brasília. There are also four regional offices located in Rio de Janeiro, São Luis, São Paulo and Tabatinga.

Branding 
In 2019, Agência Brasil received a new visual identity, it was introduced by Chief Minister of the General Secretariat of the Presidency, Luiz Eduardo Ramos in a closed ceremony, at its headquarter and simultaneously in São Paulo regional office. The Chief Minister commended EBC's president for its work. According to the President, these changes "are part of the objectives of achieving modernity, efficiency, economic and financial sustainability and improvement of public broadcasting services provided to the Brazilian population." Spokesman of the Presidency, Otávio Rêgo Barros was also present.

Privatization program 
In March 2021, the Brazilian Government included EBC in the Programa Nacional de Desestatização (National Privatization Program, in English) and has since been target of activists. National parties such as Partido dos Trabalhadores (PT), Partido Socialismo e Liberdade (PSOL), Partido Comunista do Brasil (PCdoB) and Partido Democrático Trabalhista (PDT) presented projects, defending the constitutional right to information, a study is still to happen by the Brazilian Development Bank (BNDES). According to Roni Baksys (CEO), the company has 34 properties not being used. Eletrobras was also included in the program, at the occasion.

Finances 
The privatization would result in, approximately,  in annual savings to the Union Budget.

References

External links
  
  

2007 establishments in Brazil
Government agencies established in 2007
International broadcasting
Brazilian journalism
Government agencies of Brazil
News agencies based in Brazil
Empresa Brasil de Comunicação